Ditrichaceae is a family of haplolepideous mosses (Dicranidae) in the order Dicranales.

Genera

The family Ditrichaceae contains over twenty genera:

Astomiopsis  
Bryomanginia  
Ceratodon 
Cheilothela  
Cladastomum 
Cleistocarpidium 
Crumuscus 
Cygniella  
Ditrichopsis  
Ditrichum 
Eccremidium 
Garckea 
Kleioweisiopsis 
×Pleuriditrichum 
Pleuridium  
Rhamphidium 
Skottsbergia 
Strombulidens 
Trichodon 
Tristichium 
Wilsoniella

References

Dicranales
Moss families